Somaglia is a comune (municipality) in the province of Lodi in the Italian region of Lombardy, located about  southeast of Milan and about  southeast of Lodi.

The municipality of Somaglia contains the frazione (subdivision) San Martino Pizzolano.

Somaglia borders the following municipalities: Casalpusterlengo, Codogno, Ospedaletto Lodigiano, Senna Lodigiana, Fombio, Calendasco, Guardamiglio.

Demographic evolution

References

External links 
 www.comune.somaglia.lo.it/

Cities and towns in Lombardy